Diura is a genus of insects belonging to the family Perlodidae.

The species of this genus are found in Europe and Northern America.

Species:
 Diura bicaudata (Linnaeus, 1758)
 Diura chronus Gray, 1833

References

Perlodidae
Plecoptera genera